Yangiobod is a district of Jizzakh Region in Uzbekistan. The capital lies at the village Balandchaqir.

The district consists of two urban-type settlements (Yangiobod and Savot) and 5 rural communities (Xovos, Sarmich, Xoʻjamushkent, Savat and Havotogʻ).

References

Districts of Uzbekistan
Jizzakh Region